Baron  was a general in the Imperial Japanese Army. Otani participated in the First Sino-Japanese War, Russo-Japanese War, World War I and the Russian Civil War. During the course of the latter he commanded the Vladivostok Expeditionary Force and became the formal commander of the Allied Siberian Intervention. He was elevated to baron upon his retirement in 1920.

Military career
Ōtani was born in 1856 in Obama Domain (present day Obama, Fukui as the 7th son of a Chinese literature scholar and teacher at the han school. He began his military career by enlisting into the infantry at Osaka Garrison in 1871. In 1875 he attended the Imperial Japanese Army Academy, and was commissioned as a second lieutenant the following year. HIs classmates included Ōsako Naomichi and Ijichi Kōsuke and Nagaoka Gaishi. He was promoted to lieutenant in 1883 and captain in 1886. He served on the staff of the Sendai Garrison and the IJA 2nd Division, and was promoted to major in 1892. He commanded a battalion of the IJA 8th Infantry Regiment. Two years later he joined the Imperial Japanese Army General Staff Office in Hiroshima where he served during the course of the First Sino-Japanese War.

He was promoted to lieutenant colonel in 1895 and became chief-of-staff of the IJA 4th Division the following year.  In 1897, he reached the rank of colonel and became chief-of-staff of the Guards Division. He was then assigned to the staff of the Inspectorate General of Military Training and was appointed commandant of the Army's Toyama School in 1900.

In 1902, Ōtani was elevated to major general. and assigned command of the IJA 24th Infantry Brigade, returning to the Toyama School the following year. In February 1904, he was in charge of logistics of the IJA 12th Division, and in March was in charge of logistics for the Japanese Second Army in Korea during the start of the Russo-Japanese War. In August he commanded the IJA 8th Brigade and was chief of staff of the Chosen Army from May 1905. He returned as commandant of the Toyama school in June 1906. In 1909, he was promoted to lieutenant general and given command of the IJA 5th Division.

In the aftermath of the Japanese entry into World War I and the subsequent Japanese occupation of Tsingtao Kikuzo became the commander of the Japanese garrison in the city.

In 1918, Japan joined the Allies in a joint intervention into the Russian Civil War in support of the White movement. Ōtani was appointed head of the Japanese expeditionary force with Yui Mitsue as the Chief of Staff. The Vladivostok Expeditionary Force was 60,000 men strong, comprising three divisions including the 12th Division and the 5th Division. On 12 August, Japanese forces departed from Tokyo Station for Hiroshima, where they were to board ships destined for Vladivostok. Following Vladivostok's occupation Otani became the formal commander of the Allied Siberian Intervention. In April 1920, Ōtani ordered the Allied troops to cut off eastern Transbaikal from the Bolshevik-controlled Far Eastern Republic thus creating the Chita holdup.

In 1919, he was appointed inspector general at the Inspectorate General of Military Training. He retired from active service a year later and was elevated to baron. On 1 November 1920, Ōtani was awarded the Order of the Golden Kite for his role in World War I and the Siberian intervention. He died in 1923, and his grave is at the Aoyama Cemetery in Tokyo.

Decorations

Japanese
 1895 –  Order of the Golden Kite, 4th class
 1904 -  Order of the Sacred Treasure, 4thlass 
 1904 -  Order of the Sacred Treasure, 3rd class 
 1906 –  Order of the Rising Sun, 2nd class 
 1906 –  Order of the Golden Kite, 2nd class
 1912 –  Grand Cordon of the Order of the Sacred Treasure 
 1915 –  Grand Cordon of the Order of the Rising Sun
 1920 –  Order of the Golden Kite, 1st class
 1920 –  Order of the Rising Sun: Grand Cordon of the Paulownia Flowers

Foreign decorations

References

Further reading
 
 
 

People from Fukui Prefecture
Japanese military personnel of the First Sino-Japanese War
Japanese military personnel of the Russo-Japanese War
Japanese military personnel of World War I
1856 births
1923 deaths
Japanese generals
Kazoku
Grand Cordons of the Order of the Rising Sun
Recipients of the Order of the Sacred Treasure, 1st class
Recipients of the Order of the Golden Kite, 1st class
Recipients of the Order of the Rising Sun with Paulownia Flowers